4065 Meinel, provisional designation , is an asteroid from the inner regions of the asteroid belt, approximately 4 kilometers in diameter. It was discovered on 24 September 1960, by Dutch astronomer couple Ingrid and Cornelis van Houten on photographic plates taken by Dutch–American astronomer Tom Gehrels at Palomar Observatory, California. The asteroid was named for American astronomer Aden Meinel.

Orbit and classification 

The S-type asteroid is a member of the Flora family, one of the largest groups of stony asteroids in the main-belt. It orbits the Sun in the inner main-belt at a distance of 2.1–2.4 AU once every 3 years and 5 months (1,247 days). Its orbit has an eccentricity of 0.08 and an inclination of 5° with respect to the ecliptic.
A first precovery was taken at the discovering observatory in 1953, extending Meinels observation arc by 7 years prior to its discovery.

Physical characteristics

Rotation period 

According to the survey carried out by NASA's Wide-field Infrared Survey Explorer with its subsequent NEOWISE mission, Meinel measures 3.87 kilometers in diameter and its surface has an albedo of 0.270. As of 2016, the asteroid's composition, shape and rotation period remains unknown.

Diameter and albedo 

The survey designation "P-L" stands for Palomar–Leiden, named after Palomar and Leiden Observatory, which collaborated on the fruitful Palomar–Leiden survey in the 1960s. Gehrels used Palomar's Samuel Oschin telescope (also known as the 48-inch Schmidt Telescope), and shipped the photographic plates to Ingrid and Cornelis van Houten at Leiden Observatory where astrometry was carried out. The trio are credited with the discovery of several thousand minor planets.

Naming 

This minor planet was named in honor of the American physicist and astronomer Aden Meinel (1922–2011). The official naming citation was published by the Minor Planet Center on 18 February 1992.

References

External links 
 Asteroid Lightcurve Database (LCDB), query form (info )
 Dictionary of Minor Planet Names, Google books
 Asteroids and comets rotation curves, CdR – Observatoire de Genève, Raoul Behrend
 Discovery Circumstances: Numbered Minor Planets (1)-(5000) – Minor Planet Center
 
 

004065
Discoveries by Cornelis Johannes van Houten
Discoveries by Ingrid van Houten-Groeneveld
Discoveries by Tom Gehrels
2820
Named minor planets
19600924